Dezak-e Sarcheshmeh (also Romanized as Dezzak-e Sarcheshmeh) is a village in Doab Rural District, Bazoft District, Kuhrang County, Chaharmahal and Bakhtiari Province, Iran. At the 2006 census, its population was 75, in 12 families. The village is populated by Lurs.

References 

Populated places in Kuhrang County
Luri settlements in Chaharmahal and Bakhtiari Province